The 41st Walker Cup Match was played on 8 and 9 September 2007 at the Royal County Down Golf Club in Newcastle, County Down, Northern Ireland. Team United States won 12½ to 11½. The United States won by the same score in 2005.

Format
The format for play on Saturday and Sunday are the same. There are four matches of foursomes in the morning and eight singles matches in the afternoon. In all, 24 matches are played.

Each of the 24 matches is worth one point in the larger team competition. If a match is all square after the 18th hole extra holes are not played – each side earns ½ a point toward their team total. The team that accumulates at least 12½ points wins the competition.

Teams
Ten players for the USA and Great Britain & Ireland participate in the event plus one non-playing captain for each team.

Saturday's matches

Morning foursomes

Afternoon singles

Sunday's matches

Morning foursomes

Afternoon singles

The course
The Royal County Down Golf Club in Newcastle, County Down, Northern Ireland is a par 71 course with a yardage of 7,181. Old Tom Morris is credited with designing it in 1889. In 1908, King Edward VII conferred "Royal" status to the Club.

External links
Official site
http://www.walkercuphistory.com  – definitive site containing complete history and statistics (paid subscription site).
Royal County Down Golf Club official site

Walker Cup
Golf tournaments in Northern Ireland
International sports competitions hosted by Northern Ireland
Walker Cup
Walker Cup
Walker Cup
21st century in County Down